John V (died 1042/1053) was the son and successor of Sergius IV as Duke of Naples from 1034 until his death.

In 1034 Pandulf IV of Capua instigated a revolt in Sorrento and annexed it to Capua.  In the same year, Sergius IV's sister died and her husband, Rainulf Drengot, returned to Pandulf's allegiance. Broken in spirit, Sergius retired to the monastery of the Holy Saviour in insula maris, where the Castello del'Ovo now stands. He was succeeded by his son John V, who allied with Guaimar IV of Salerno, another enemy of Pandulf's. John was sent by Guaimar to Constantinople to beseech the aid of the Byzantine Emperor. During his absence, Sergius briefly came out of retirement to act as regent. Ultimately the emperor ignored his pleas. Sergius was back in his monastery by June 1036.

John did homage to Guaimar and remained faithful to him throughout his reign. In 1038 he founded a church a Naples dedicated to Saint Simeon, although its location is unclear.

Notes

Sources
Chalandon, Ferdinand. Histoire de la domination normande en Italie et en Sicilie. Paris, 1907.

1042 deaths
11th-century dukes of Naples
Year of birth unknown